Elections to Basingstoke and Deane Borough Council took place on 6 May 2021 as part of the 2021 United Kingdom local elections. They took place at the same time as the elections for Hampshire County Council and the Hampshire Police and Crime Commissioner.

Background 
Whilst an election for the County Council had already been planned, District Council Elections were delayed due to the ongoing COVID-19 pandemic, meaning that they are due to be held at the same time as the Hampshire County Council Elections.

The Conservatives won 12 seats at the previous election, with Labour and the Liberal Democrats winning 4 each. Subsequent to the 2019 election, initially nine former Labour Councillors joined with existing independent councillors to form the Basingstoke & Deane Independent Group, which by May 2021 had 10 borough councillors, sitting as part of The Independent Forum alongside an independent. Alongside the Basingstoke & Deane Independents, the newly founded county-wide Hampshire Independents are also standing several candidates.

The Statement of persons nominated was revealed on Friday 9 April 2021.

Results 
The Conservatives won 33 seats across the district, whilst Labour won 10, the Liberal Democrats and Basingstoke & Deane Independents won 5 seats each, and a non-affiliated independent won a seat.

Results by Ward

Basing & Upton Grey

Bramley

Brighton Hill

Brookvale & Kings Furlong

Chineham

Eastrop & Grove

Evingar

Hatch Warren & Beggarwood

Kempshott & Buckskin

Norden

Oakley & The Candovers

Popley

Sherborne St John & Rooksdown

South Ham

Tadley & Pamber

Tadley North, Kingsclere & Baughurst

Whitchurch, Overton & Laverstoke

Winklebury & Manydown

References 

2021
Basingstoke and Deane
2020s in Hampshire
May 2021 events in the United Kingdom